Dalaca vibicata is a species of moth of the family Hepialidae. It is known from Ecuador.

References

External links
Hepialidae genera

Moths described in 1914
Hepialidae
Lepidoptera of Ecuador